Do Bhai  is a 1969 Indian Hindi-language action drama film, produced and directed by Brij Sadanah, and written by Salim Khan (credited as Prince Salim). It stars Ashok Kumar, Mala Sinha, Jeetendra and music composed by Laxmikant–Pyarelal. The film was remade in Tamil in 1971 as Justice Viswanathan and in Telugu in 1971 as Nenu Manishine.

Though the story of this movie is credited only to Salim Khan, the core plot went on to be partially rehashed by the Salim–Javed duo for their debut South Indian movie as original story writers - the 1976 Kannada movie Premada Kanike which was also later remade in Tamil in 1980 as Polladhavan and in Hindi in 1981 as Raaz.

Plot 
Justice Ajay Verma (Ashok Kumar) an honorable and deified by the town. Once, he is acquainted with a client Ranjana (Chand Usmani) and in a short while, an intimacy develops between them. Soon they couple up without the knowledge of anyone except his close friend Mahesh (Man Mohan). Suddenly, Ajay Babu has to depart on emergency accommodating Ranjana at Mahesh but the heinous molest the pregnant woman. After return, Ajay Babu could not find the whereabouts of both. One night, leaving the newborn baby at Ajay Babu's residence with a letter proclaiming the brutality of Mahesh, Ranjana commits suicide. Knowing it, Ajay Babu explodes and desperately wanders in search of Mahesh for 5 years. Besides, Jwala Singh (Sheikh Mukhtar) the brother of Ranjana meets Mahesh who purports Ajay Babu as the imposter. Ultimately, Ajay Babu triumphs in his hunt and slays Mahesh in a train which is witnessed by a woman Sandhya (Mala Sinha). Destiny takes her to Ajay Babu's residence as governance to his daughter. S.P. Vijay Verma (Jeetendra) a cop, the younger brother of Ajay Babu falls for her. Later, Sandhya is astounded to see Ajay Babu therein and she is seized. Moreover, she is endangered of life-threat to her infant sister. Jwala Singh observes it and tries to help her when she reveals the actuality to him. Panic-stricken, Sandhya meets with an accident when Ajay Babu rescues her. After recovery, she questions him about the reason behind his crime then he divulges the fact, whereby, Sandhya adores him. Meanwhile, Jwala Singh accuses Ajay Babu as a criminal before Vijay. Listening to it, he afflicts but solidly digs out the truth. Despite having a chance to rescue his brother Vijay stands for justice. In tandem, enraged Jwala Singh shoots Ajay Babu with his revolver when he discovers him as Ranjana's brother. Vijay detects that Mahesh's murder has also happened with the same revolver and Jwala Singh is charged with the two crimes. Since he is aware of the truth through Sandhya, Jwala Singh takes the blame. At last, Ajay Babu arrives, declares himself guilty, and acquits Jwala Singh. Finally, the movie ends with Ajay Babu leaving his last breath in the court hall.

Cast 
 Ashok Kumar as Justice Ajay Verma
 Jeetendra as SP Vijay Verma
 Mala Sinha as Sandhya
 Chand Usmani as Ranjana
 Sheikh Mukhtar as Jwala Singh
 Manmohan as Ramesh
 Jagdeep as Gullu
 Malika as Jhuniya
 Asit Sen
 C.S. Dubey
 Jayshree T.

Soundtrack

References

External links
 

1960s Hindi-language films
1960s action drama films
Films scored by Laxmikant–Pyarelal
Hindi films remade in other languages
1960s Urdu-language films
Urdu films remade in other languages
Indian courtroom films
Indian action drama films
Films directed by Brij Sadanah